D-dopachrome decarboxylase is an enzyme that in humans is encoded by the DDT gene.

D-dopachrome tautomerase converts D-dopachrome into 5,6-dihydroxyindole. The DDT gene is related to the macrophage migration inhibitory factor (MIF) in terms of sequence, enzyme activity, and gene structure. DDT and MIF are closely linked on chromosome 22.

See also 
 Macrophage migration inhibitory factor domain

References

Further reading